Anthony Frederick Tonnos (born August 1, 1935) is a Canadian prelate who currently serves as the Emeritus Bishop of the Roman Catholic Diocese of Hamilton.

Education 
Tonnos studied at the University of Toronto, where he received a Bachelor of Arts degree. He then went to study at the University of St. Michael's College where he received a Bachelor of Sacred Theology.

On September 24, 2010, Tonnos had retired. He continues to serve as the Emeritus Bishop of the Roman Catholic Diocese of Hamilton

The Hamilton-Wentworth Catholic District School Board named one of their secondary schools in Ancaster in his honour, Bishop Tonnos Catholic Secondary School.

References

External links 

20th-century Roman Catholic bishops in Canada
1935 births
Living people
People from Port Colborne
University of Toronto alumni
21st-century Roman Catholic bishops in Canada